Austrapoda beijingensis is a species of moth of the family Limacodidae. It is found in China.

References
 , 2011: Six new species and twelve newly recorded species of Limacodidae from China (Lepidoptera: Zygaenoidea). Acta Zootaxonomica Sinica 36 (2)

Limacodidae
Moths of Asia
Moths described in 2011